TAPinto is a network of more than 80 independently owned and operated local news websites in New Jersey, New York, and Florida. Based in New Providence, New Jersey, TAPinto.net is one of the largest online local news gathering operations in New Jersey. It was founded by New Providence residents Michael and Lauryn Shapiro in October 2008 to provide independent local news. In the past two decades there has been a seismic decline in local journalism, with many publications going bankrupt; in the coverage vacuum, hyperlocal online media such as TAPinto are often the only local news coverage that many communities get.

TAPinto operates on a franchise model. Each TAPinto site is independently owned and operated by a franchisee, who pays an annual fee and a percentage of advertising revenue to the owners. In exchange, the network provides a content management system and helps with both the business and editorial sides of their operation. Some sites are operated by individuals, while others are operated by a group of two to four people who each work on the site part-time. Many of the site owners are business-oriented people, nonprofits, and one is managed by a university. Other site owners include political consultants and aides, such as Steve Lenox, who owns the Bayonne, Paterson, Hamilton/Robbinsville, Hoboken, and Jersey City sites; journalists, such as magazine journalist Jackie Lieberman and former Star-Ledger reporter Fred J. Aun, who operates TAPinto Roxbury. Several are former editors for Patch Media, a hyperlocal news network formerly operated by America Online.

In 2014, the network's name was changed from The Alternative Press to TAPinto and it began using the new web address of TAPinto.net. In 2018, TAPinto's franchise model for local news was featured in Street Fight magazine. In 2017, CEO Michael Shapiro appeared on One on One with Steve Adubato discussing the state of news media and the TAPinto model.

Notable coverage
In 2017, TAPinto Newark broke the story of an auxiliary bishop of the Roman Catholic Archdiocese of Newark being punched in the face during Mass at Newark's Cathedral Basilica of the Sacred Heart and then became the first media outlet in the country to obtain and air the video of the assault. In 2016, TAPinto was the primary source when it covered how a Yorktown man won a $76,000 jackpot on the TV game show Wheel of Fortune; TAPinto reported that the contestant learned about the show's theme in advance and studied prodigiously, enabling him to solve an entire puzzle while only knowing the first letter. TAPinto was the first to report the meeting of comedians Stephen Colbert and Jerry Seinfeld at a taping of Seinfeld's show Comedians in Cars Getting Coffee which was filmed in Montclair, New Jersey. It has sponsored government events such as the annual Meet the Mayors breakfast. TAPinto engages in collaborative partnerships including TAPinto Cranford partnering with a Cranford Radio station on an innovative podcast. TAPinto sponsored summittoday.org, a free community calendar for the city of Summit by providing a digital solution for content creation, as well as hosting the site free of charge. TAPinto was also named 2017 Partner of the Year by NJ News Commons.

References

External links 
 TAPinto franchise information

Internet properties established in 2008
Local mass media in the United States
Mass media in New Jersey
Mass media in Pennsylvania
New Providence, New Jersey
Companies based in Morris County, New Jersey